The posterior interosseous artery (dorsal interosseous artery) is an artery of the forearm. It is a branch of the common interosseous artery, which is a branch of the ulnar artery.

Structure 
The posterior interosseous artery passes backward between the oblique cord and the upper border of the interosseous membrane. It appears between the contiguous borders of supinator muscle and the abductor pollicis longus muscle, and runs down the back of the forearm between the superficial and deep layers of muscles, to both of which it distributes branches.

Where it lies on abductor pollicis longus muscle and the extensor pollicis brevis muscle, it is accompanied by the dorsal interosseous nerve. At the lower part of the forearm it anastomoses with the termination of the volar interosseous artery, and with the dorsal carpal network.

Branches 
Near its origin, it gives off the interosseous recurrent artery. This ascends to the interval between the lateral epicondyle and olecranon, on or through the fibers of supinator muscle, but beneath the anconeus muscle, and anastomoses with the middle collateral branch of the deep artery of arm, the posterior ulnar recurrent artery and the inferior ulnar collateral artery.

The posterior interosseous artery gives off many muscular arteries.

Additional images

See also
 Anterior interosseous artery
 Ulnar artery

References

External links
 
 
  - "Dorsum of the hand, deep dissection, posterior view"

Arteries of the upper limb